K.M. Aminul Islam Khan  was a former Jatiya Party (Ershad)  Member of Parliament of Munshiganj-3. He was the paternal uncle of M. Hamidullah Khan TJ, SH, BP, BDF Sector Commander, Sector 11, 1971 War of Independence.

Career
Aminul Islam Khan was a career Air Force officer in the Pakistan Air Force until as a Wing Commander. He was jailed in India during the war of independence. His course mate A. K. Khandker after the war secured his release and enrolled him to Banglaresh Air Force. Khandekar promoted Khan to Vice-Marshal of Bangladesh Air Force and secured him an appointment as the third Director of the Directorate of Forces Intelligence which was later christened as Directorate General of Forces Intelligence headed by a Director General. Aminul Islam Khan was relieved of duty after the 1977 hijack of Japan Airlines Flight 472 and the uprising that ensued.

Islam was elected to parliament from Munshiganj-3 as a Jatiya Party candidate in 1986.

References

Jatiya Party politicians
Living people
3rd Jatiya Sangsad members
Year of birth missing (living people)